is a Japanese politician of the Democratic Party of Japan, a member of the House of Councillors in the Diet (national legislature). A native of Saga Prefecture and graduate of Kyoto University, he worked at the Bank of Japan from 1984 until 2004 when he ran unsuccessfully for the House of Councillors. He ran again in 2007 and was elected for the first time.

References

External links 
  

Members of the House of Councillors (Japan)
Kyoto University alumni
Living people
1961 births
Democratic Party of Japan politicians